B2B Bank is a Schedule I Canadian bank that serves a network of some 27,000 financial professionals across key business verticals including: financial advisors and their dealerships; deposit and mortgage brokers and their firms; mutual fund and insurance manufacturers; MFDA and IIROC members.

Operations
B2B Bank offers investment and Registered Retirement Savings Plan loans, broker deposits, broker mortgages, and investment and banking accounts to a network of 27,000 financial professionals including: financial advisors and their dealerships; deposit and mortgage brokers and their firms; mutual fund and insurance manufacturers; MFDA and IIROC members.

History
B2B Bank is a wholly owned subsidiary of Laurentian Bank of Canada. In 1996, Laurentian Bank acquired North American Trust's personal and commercial portfolios forming a division known as Agency Banking. Four years later, Laurentian purchased Sun Life Trust Company and merged the business with the Agency Banking division. On July 1, 2000, the resulting organization was renamed B2B Trust. On July 7, 2012, the company became a Schedule I bank and was renamed B2B Bank. B2B Bank's head office is located in Toronto's financial district.

Membership
B2B Bank is a member of the Canada Deposit Insurance Corporation (CDIC).

It is also part of THE EXCHANGE Network owned by FICANEX.

References

External links
 B2B Bank
 Laurentian Bank of Canada

Banks of Canada
Companies based in Toronto
Laurentian Bank of Canada